Aires Pinto de Sousa Coutinho was a noble, colonial administrator, 6th Captain-General of the Azores, Field Marshal and master of the House of Balsemão and Ferreiros de Tendais.

Biography
Sousa Coutinho was a virtuous, religious person, generally characterized as polite and stern.

Captaincy-General
He was nominated to the post of Captain-General on 15 December 1809, and disembarked in Angra do Heroísmo on 7 September 1810, taking-up his post two days later. 

Aires' governorship was linked to the creation of the Military Academy in Angra (decreed by King John VI); the construction of the military road of Praia (linking Angra and Praia) and the battery installed in the Fort of Santo António do Monte Brasil, in addition to the transformation of Ponta Delgada into a free trade zone (a consequence of the Peninsular Wars) and which ended the construction of the trans-Atlantic port in Vila Franca). Owing to anomalies created by the Portuguese Corte's stay in Angra, the municipal council of Angra requested that Aires Pinto create a tribunal to investigate. 

Aires Pinto continued to support many of his predecessor's initiatives to maintain the islands' subsistence, including improving irrigation and distribution of potable water to Mosteiros and Ponta Delgada, and the establishment of the Junta de Melhoramento Agrícola (Agricultural Improvement Board).  But, these failed to stop the revolts and protests caused by the shipment of wheat from Praia. In health, an epidemic of smallpox and contagious fevers, the General ordered the construction of an "ambulatory pharmacy", and provided the conditions to stem the epidemic. He also restricted hunting of partridge, quail, woodcocks and wild rabbit. 

Sousa Coutinho was virtuoso, religious and polite, but grave, and governed his mandate with competency and overall satisfaction. Following Napoleon's defeat at Waterloo, and exile to Elba, he had proclaimed, the drubbing of the "despot of France and jailer of Europe", before decreeing an amnesty and pardoning the deportees of the Amazonas.

References

Notes

Sources
 
 

Captains-General of the Azores